This was the first edition of the tournament.

Wesley Koolhof and Artem Sitak won the title after defeating Guido Andreozzi and Ariel Behar 6–3, 6–2 in the final.

Seeds

Draw

References
 Main Draw

JC Ferrero Challenger Open - Doubles